Route 460 is a  east-west Canadian provincial highway in Newfoundland and Labrador.

It is located on the west coast of the island of Newfoundland and has its western terminus at Cape St. George, the westernmost tip of the Port au Port Peninsula, and its eastern terminus at an interchange in Harry's Brook with Route 1, the Trans-Canada Highway, at Exit 3.

The highway has developed in several distinct sections:

 Harrys Brook to interchange with Route 461 at Long Gull Pond (17 km) was developed at the time that the Trans-Canada Highway was built across Newfoundland in the early 1960s, this section is known as White's Road.
 Long Gull Pond to interchange with Route 490 at Stephenville (16 km), the Hansen Memorial Highway, was developed by the US Army Corps of Engineers to run from Ernest Harmon AFB to the Newfoundland Railway main line at Long Gull Pond.  Later, the USACE constructed its own narrow gauge railway line to connect the base with the main line, parallel to the Hansen Memorial Highway.
 Interchange with Route 490 at Stephenville to western boundary of Kippens (4.5 km), known as Kippens Road.
 Continuation from western boundary of Kippens through Port au Port and along the south coast of the Port au Port Peninsula to Cape St. George (51 km), the Port au Port Highway.

Communities along Route 460

Black Duck Siding
Stephenville Crossing
Noel's Pond
Stephenville
Kippens
Romaines
Port au Port
Port au Port West
Felix Cove
Man of War Cove
Campbell's Creek
Abraham's Cove
Ship Cove-Lower Cove-Jerry's Nose
Sheaves Cove
Marches Point
Loretto
Red Brook
De Grau
Grand Jardin
Petit Jardin
Cape St. George

Communities off of Route 460

Aguathuna
Boswarlos

Construction history for Hansen Memorial Highway section

The US Army Corps of Engineers began work on the Stephenville bypass road in the 1950s. Company C, under the command of Capt. Claxton Ray, began at Stephenville and worked towards Company B, under the command of Capt. Gomez, which had commenced construction near Cormiers Village and were working in both directions, towards Long Gull Pond and towards Stephenville. It was necessary for Company B to begin construction of the road at Cormiers Village and work back towards Stephenville pending the finalizing of property agreements.

The eleven-mile-long (18 km) highway construction project began with a line of corduroy roads comprising one half of the road, and when Long Gull Pond was reached in the fall of 1954, the other half was constructed. The road was then extended along the Newfoundland Railway main line from Long Gull Pond to Stephenville Crossing (this section is now the eastern terminus of Route 461.

It was necessary to build three access roads approximately two miles in length in order to facilitate construction of the bypass road. These roads were built to the same specifications as the bypass road as they were used constantly for heavy hauling. A concrete bridge was built over Cold Creek in 1954 and a 60-foot (20 m) concrete bridge was built over Warm Creek in 1956.

The project required 90,000 cubic yards (70,000 m³) of fill as well as 30,000 cubic yards (20,000 m³) of crushed rock to complete the sub-base.  The travel surface required 15,000 cubic yards (10,000 m³) of gravel, 19 inches thick before asphalt was applied.  Construction equipment and material were stored at a depot Long Gull Pond during the project.

The bypass road was officially opened for military and public users in October 1957.

Major intersections

References

460
Monuments and memorials in Newfoundland and Labrador